Kharkiv National Automobile and Highway University is a Ukrainian university in Kharkiv.

Post address: 61002, Ukraine, Kharkiv, Yaroslava Mudrogo street, 25.

History
23 July 1930 – Kharkiv Automobile and Highway Institute (KhADI) was established;
April 1993 – the higher education establishment is awarded the IV level of accreditation, and it is given a new name as Kharkiv State Automobile and Highway Technical University (KhSAHTU);
August 2001 – the university is awarded the status of national and it is renamed as Kharkiv National Automobile and Highway University.

Campuses and buildings
The main teaching and laboratory building.
Teaching and laboratory building of road construction department.
Teaching and laboratory building mechanical department and the Faculty of Business and Management.
ground automobile and road machinery.
Teaching and Laboratory Building Faculty of Mechatronics vehicles, training laboratory diagnosis of motor transport.
Scientific Library of the University.
Campus of the University.

Institutes and faculties
Vehicles (Automobile) Faculty
Road Construction Department
Mechanical Engineering Department
Faculty of Management and Business
Department of Transport Systems
Faculty of Mechatronics vehicles
Department of Foreign Citizens

Awards and reputation
In the rating of Ukrainian universities in terms of employers KhNADU occupies 18th place in technical disciplines

Alumni 
The following are the notable alumni of the university:
 Sergii Iermakov — Ukrainian physical training and sports researcher, Master of Sports in volleyball, Doctor of Pedagogy, full professor, academician of the Academy of Sciences of Ukraine

References
Official site
Ukrainian Wikipedia

National universities in Ukraine